Ron Erickson (born April 20, 1933 in Peoria, Illinois) is a Democratic Party member of the Montana Senate. In 2009, he was elected for Senate District 47, representing Missoula, Montana. He was a member of the Montana House of Representatives, representing District 93 from 1998 to 2009.

External links
Montana House of Representatives – Ron Erickson Official MT State Legislature website
Project Vote Smart – Representative Ron Erickson (MT) profile
Follow the Money – Ron Erickson
2008 2006 2002 2000 1998 campaign contributions

Democratic Party members of the Montana House of Representatives
1933 births
Living people
Democratic Party Montana state senators
Politicians from Peoria, Illinois
Bradley University alumni
University of Iowa alumni
People from Missoula, Montana